Hemipenthes sinuosa, the sinuous bee fly, is a species of bee fly in the family Bombyliidae, found in North America.

References

External links

 

Bombyliidae